In organic chemistry, methoxides are organic salts with a  anion. They are the simplest alkoxides. Sodium methoxide and potassium methoxide have widespread use, though other metal-cation variants such as lithium methoxide, rubidium methoxide, and caesium methoxide exist as well.

Methoxide ion 
The methoxide ion has the formula of CH3O− and is the conjugate base of methanol. It is a strong organic base, and since it is stronger than the inorganic hydroxide ion, it can remove a hydrogen atom from a water molecule, yielding methanol and hydroxide. Therefore, methoxide solutions must be kept free of water.

Sodium methoxide 

Sodium methoxide, also called sodium methylate and sodium methanolate, is a white powder when pure.  It is used as an initiator of an anionic addition polymerization with ethylene oxide, forming a polyether with high molecular weight. Both sodium methoxide and its counterpart prepared with potassium are frequently used as catalysts for commercial-scale production of biodiesel. In this process, vegetable oils or animal fats, which chemically are fatty acid triglycerides, are transesterified with methanol to give fatty acid methyl esters (FAMEs).

Sodium methoxide is produced on an industrial scale and available from a number of chemical companies.

Potassium methoxide

Potassium methoxide is commonly used as a catalyst for transesterification in the production of biodiesel.

References

Salts
Alkoxides